The Wisden 100 is a set of lists created by Wisden which attempted to objectively rate the 100 best individual innings performances in Test and One Day International cricket in each of the disciplines of batting and bowling. The Test list was released in 2001 and the ODI list was released in 2002.

The ratings were calculated by scoring each individual batting and bowling performance in various criteria. Apart from the player's actual score or figures, criteria which were taken into account included the strength of the opposition players, the quality of the pitch, the result of the match, and the player's contribution to this result. The maximum possible rating was 300.

Overall in both formats, 13 innings of Vivian Richards were selected by Wisden more than anyone in the list.

Test cricket

The Wisden 100 list for Test cricket was released on 26 July 2001.

The top-rated batting performance was Donald Bradman's 270 for Australia against England at Melbourne in the 1936–37 Ashes series. 5 of Bradman's innings appeared in the top 100, more than any other batsman.

The top-rated bowling performance was Hugh Tayfield's 9/113 for South Africa against England at Johannesburg in the 1956–57 series. Curtly Ambrose and Harbhajan Singh each had 4 performances in the top 100, more than any other bowler.

Top 10 Batting performances

For the full list, see Top 100 Batsmen (Test) at Rediff.com.

Top 10 Bowling performances

For the full list, see Top 100 Bowlers (Test) at Rediff.com.

Controversy
Despite his highly impressive career record, not one of Sachin Tendulkar's innings appeared in the top 100 batting performances. His omission was strongly criticised by fans and many sections of the media in India. Wisden defended the list stating that performances which made a major contribution to victory received a much larger weighting than those in which the match was drawn or lost. Tendulkar's most important innings had usually come in draws and defeats, and therefore received a lower weighting.

The list also received general criticism from a few leading sports editors.

Updating the list
The list has had no official updated release since its inception. However, shortly after the list's release, Wisden stated that Mark Butcher's match-winning innings of 173* in the 4th Test of the 2001 Ashes series placed him in 48th place on the batting list with a rating of 200.8.

ODI cricket
Following the success of the list for Test cricket, the Wisden 100 list for ODI cricket was released on 1 February 2002.

The top-rated batting performance was Viv Richards' 189* for West Indies against England at Manchester in 1984. 7 of Richards' innings appeared in the top 100, more than any other batsman.

The top-rated bowling performance was Gary Gilmour's 6/14 for Australia against England at Leeds in 1975. Waqar Younis appears 9 times in the top 100, more than any other player.

Top 10 Batting performances

For the full list, see Top 100 Batsmen (ODI) at Rediff.com.

Top 10 Bowling performances

For the full list, see Top 100 Bowlers (ODI) at Rediff.com.

Updating the list
As with the Test cricket list, this list has had no official updated release since its inception. However, Wisden stated that Ricky Ponting's 140* against India in the 2003 World Cup final placed him 2nd on the batting list.

All-time lists
Following the launch of the top Test and ODI performances lists, Wisden received many requests asking whether it was possible to create a ranking list of all-time great players by using the same formula and examining the average rating each player received per innings. Including a weighting for players with longer careers, Wisden arrived at the lists below. In Tests, Donald Bradman was the clear leader in the batting category and Muttiah Muralitharan was ranked as the top bowler. In the ODI section, Viv Richards and Wasim Akram are the top-ranked players.

Top 5 Test batsmen

Top 5 Test bowlers

For the full Top 10 list for Test cricket, see All-time W100 Test Top 10s at Cricinfo.com.

Top 5 ODI batsmen

Top 5 ODI bowlers

For the full Top 10 list for ODI cricket, see All-time W100 ODI Top 10s at Cricinfo.com.

Other lists
The same methodology was used to rank each player's overall performance in the 2003 Cricket World Cup. In this list, the top batsman was Sachin Tendulkar and the top bowler was Glenn McGrath.

References

External links
 Wisden 100 for Test cricket at Rediff.com
 Wisden 100 for ODI cricket at Rediff.com

Cricket awards and rankings
Wisden